Gan Ping Sieu (born 18 April 1966) is a Malaysian politician. He was elected as the Johor State Legislative Assemblyman for Mengkibol for one term from 2004 to 2008. He is a member of Malaysian Chinese Association (MCA), a major component party in Barisan Nasional (BN) coalition. From 2010 to 2013, he served as a Senator and Deputy Minister of Youth and Sports.

Background 
Kluang-born Gan Ping Sieu comes from a family with long tradition in serving the community in the town and its surrounding areas. One of his uncles had served as Kluang Member of Parliament, while another had served as Assemblyman for Paloh. Ping Sieu's late father was a pioneer MCA member and a well-respected figure within Kluang Chinese societies circles. Many of his relatives are still active in community work whether as local councillor, village committees or non-governmental organizations.

Over the decades, Ping Sieu has carried on the family tradition of serving the Kluang community. Among others, he had served as Kluang Municipal councillor; Committee Member of the Kluang Chinese Chamber of Commerce; Chong Hwa High School and Vice-President of the Kluang Chinese Association. Trained as a lawyer, he had also acted as legal advisor to over 100 NGOs in Kluang. He was appointed Special Officer to the Johor Menteri Besar for DUN Mengkibol in 2008, a post which had allowed him to bridge the community and government agencies more effectively.

In MCA, Ping Sieu was elected party Vice-President in 2010, where he served until 2013. He's currently the Chairman of the party's Syariah law and Policy Implementation Taskforce.

Education 
Ping Sieu graduated with a Bachelor's of Law degree from Queen Mary College, University of London. Having the knack for learning, he subsequently pursued a Diploma in Syariah Law in the International Islamic University and a Master's of Law from University of Malaya.

Currently 
He's currently the Co-President of the Centre For A Better Tomorrow (CENBET), a pro-moderation and good governance civil society group. Its other Co-President is former Malaysian Bar Council president, Dato' Lim Chee Wee. Ping Sieu had also served as the Panel Advisory Member of the National Service Training Programme (PLKN) between 2005 and 2009.

Ping Sieu is now heading a law firm with seventy-eight offices across the country, dealing in diverse areas such as corporate restructuring, conveyancing, civil and criminal litigation, land matters and retail banking, among others.

Election results

References

External links 
Senate Member's Page - Parliament of Malaysia

Living people
People from Johor
Malaysian people of Hokkien descent
Malaysian people of Chinese descent
Malaysian politicians of Chinese descent
20th-century Malaysian lawyers
Malaysian Chinese Association politicians
Members of the Johor State Legislative Assembly
Members of the Dewan Negara
21st-century Malaysian politicians
1966 births
21st-century Malaysian lawyers